Benjamin Hertwig is a Canadian poet, whose debut poetry collection Slow War was a shortlisted finalist for the Governor General's Award for English-language poetry at the 2017 Governor General's Awards.

A former member of the Canadian Armed Forces who served in Afghanistan, he has also published short fiction and non-fiction work in Maisonneuve, Canadian Literature, The Walrus, Ricepaper, Geez, Prairie Fire, Pleiades and The New York Times. He won a National Magazine Award in the Personal Journalism category in 2017 for "The Burn".

References

External links

21st-century Canadian poets
Canadian male poets
Canadian non-fiction writers
Canadian magazine writers
Canadian male non-fiction writers
Living people
21st-century Canadian male writers
Year of birth missing (living people)